Kompetenz-kompetenz, or competence-competence, is a jurisprudential doctrine whereby a legal body, such as a court or arbitral tribunal, may have competence, or jurisdiction, to rule as to the extent of its own competence on an issue before it. The concept arose in the Federal Constitutional Court of Germany. Since then, kompetenz-kompetenz has often been important in international arbitration.

Origin

In arbitration 
The doctrine of kompetenz-kompetenz is enshrined in the UNCITRAL Model Law on International Commercial Arbitration and Arbitration Rules. Article 16(1) of the Model Law and article 23(1) of the Arbitration Rules both dictate that "[t]he arbitral tribunal shall have the power to rule on its own jurisdiction, including any objections with respect to the existence or validity of the arbitration agreement." United States arbitration law does not expressly address the principle of kompetenz-kompetenz, but courts have consistently recognised such a power where the parties have granted it to the tribunal.

See also 
Parliamentary sovereignty
Primacy of European Union law

References 

Arbitration law
Jurisprudence
Law of Germany
Jurisdiction
International law